York Catholic High School  is a Catholic high school located in York, Pennsylvania, U.S., and operated by the Roman Catholic Diocese of Harrisburg for boys and girls in the 7th through 12th grades.

References

Roman Catholic Diocese of Harrisburg
High schools in Central Pennsylvania
Catholic secondary schools in Pennsylvania
Schools in York County, Pennsylvania
Private middle schools in Pennsylvania
Buildings and structures in York, Pennsylvania